Annette Laursen  (born 26 February 1975) was a female  Danish football defender.

She was part of the Denmark women's national football team. She competed at the 1996 Summer Olympics, playing 3 matches. On club level she played for HEI Århus.

See also
 Denmark at the 1996 Summer Olympics

References

External links
 
 
 http://www.cumountainlions.com/sports/2012/12/4/WSOC_1204125834.aspx?id=176
 FIFA.com
 http://www.gettyimages.com/photos/annette-laursen?autocorrect=none&excludenudity=true&family=editorial&mediatype=photography&page=1&phrase=Annette%20Laursen&sort=mostpopular

1975 births
Living people
Danish women's footballers
Place of birth missing (living people)
Footballers at the 1996 Summer Olympics
Olympic footballers of Denmark
Women's association football defenders
1995 FIFA Women's World Cup players
Denmark women's international footballers